The 2022 Open de Tenis Ciudad de Pozoblanco was a professional tennis tournament played on hard courts. It was the 16th edition of the tournament which was part of the 2022 ATP Challenger Tour. It took place in Pozoblanco, Spain between 18 and 24 July 2022.

Singles main-draw entrants

Seeds

 1 Rankings are as of 11 July 2022.

Other entrants
The following players received wildcards into the singles main draw:
  Daniel Mérida
  Alejandro Moro Cañas
  Carlos Sánchez Jover

The following player received entry into the singles main draw as an alternate:
  Nicholas David Ionel

The following players received entry from the qualifying draw:
  Dan Added
  Dali Blanch
  Omar Jasika
  Adrián Menéndez Maceiras
  Iñaki Montes de la Torre
  Federico Zeballos

Champions

Singles

 Constant Lestienne def.  Grégoire Barrère 6–0, 7–6(7–3).

Doubles

 Dan Added /  Albano Olivetti def.  Victor Vlad Cornea /  Luis David Martínez 3–6, 6–1, [12–10].

References

2022 ATP Challenger Tour
2022
2022 in Spanish tennis
July 2022 sports events in Spain